West Road may be:

 West Road, Cambridge, England
 West Road River, British Columbia, Canada

See also 
 East-West road connection, Melbourne, Australia
 Great West Road, London, England
 Great West Road, Zambia
 Great South West Road, A30 road, England
 Minquan West Road Station, Taipei City, Taiwan
 The Road West, an American Western  television series
 ZhongXiao West Road, Taipei City, Taiwan